Wang Sai Phun is a district (amphoe) in the eastern part of Phichit province, central Thailand.

History
Tambon Wang Sai Phun, Nong Phra and Nong Pla Lai were separated from Mueang Phichit District and made up the new minor district (king amphoe) Wang Sai Phun on 1 August 1975. It was upgraded to a full district on July 13, 1981. The government assigned Tambon Nong Plong of Mueang Phichit to be part of Wang Sai Phun on 23 September 1993.

Geography
Neighboring districts are (from the south clockwise) Thap Khlo, Taphan Hin, Mueang Phichit, Sak Lek of Phichit Province and Noen Maprang of Phitsanulok province.

Administration
The district is divided into four sub-districts (tambon), which are further subdivided into 57 villages (muban). Wang Sai Phun is a township (thesaban tambon) which covers parts of tambon Wang Sai Phun and Nong Phra. There are a further four tambon administrative organizations (TAO).

References

External links
amphoe.com

Wang Sai Phun